Journal of Botany is a Hindawi academic journal.

Journal of Botany may also refer to:

American Journal of Botany
Australian Journal of Botany
Journal of Botany, British and Foreign

Not to be confused with
Journal de Botanique

See also
Botany (journal), formerly the Canadian Journal of Botany
 New Journal of Botany, European journal formerly called Watsonia